Asiab Sar or As Yab Sar may refer to various places in Iran:
 Asiab Sar, Siahkal, Gilan Province
 Asiab Sar, Sowme'eh Sara, Gilan Province
 Asiab Sar, Behshahr, Mazandaran Province
 Asiab Sar, Miandorud, Mazandaran Province
 Asiab Sar, Qaem Shahr, Mazandaran Province
 Asiab Sar, Ramsar, Mazandaran Province
 Asiab Sar, Sari, Mazandaran Province